Friend Opportunity is the eighth studio album by American indie rock band Deerhoof. It was released on January 23, 2007, on Kill Rock Stars, ATP Recordings and 5 Rue Christine.

Twelve different front covers were designed for the album by the British artist David Shrigley.

Composition
Friend shows Deerhoof shift into traditional pop rock, yielding a "pretty intricate [and] proggy" take on the genre. Along with experimental pop, it is also seen as a return to the "listener-friendly" avant-garde music that appeared on Apple O' and Milk Man.

Track listing

Personnel
John Dieterich – guitar
Satomi Matsuzaki – bass, vocals
Greg Saunier – drums, vocals

Charts

References

Deerhoof albums
2007 albums
5 Rue Christine albums
Kill Rock Stars albums
ATP Recordings albums